William Chad Zerbe (born April 27, 1972) is a former professional baseball relief pitcher. He played in Major League Baseball for the San Francisco Giants from 2000 to 2003.

Career
Zerbe played nine seasons in minor league baseball before making his major league debut in 2000. He began his career in the Los Angeles Dodgers organization in 1991, and was released at the end of the 1996 season. After a brief stint with the Arizona Diamondbacks organization, he was signed by the Giants after the 1997 season.

In the major leagues, Zerbe had a career record of 6–1 with an ERA of 3.87. He was the winning pitcher in Game 5 of the 2002 World Series against the Anaheim Angels. As of 2011, he holds the all-time Major League Baseball record for registering the most career appearances before his first loss.

References

External links

Major League Baseball pitchers
San Francisco Giants players
Gulf Coast Dodgers players
Great Falls Dodgers players
Bakersfield Dodgers players
Vero Beach Dodgers players
San Bernardino Spirit players
San Antonio Missions players
Sonoma County Crushers players
Hillsborough Hawks baseball players
High Desert Mavericks players
San Jose Giants players
Shreveport Captains players
Bakersfield Blaze players
Fresno Grizzlies players
Buffalo Bisons (minor league) players
Mahoning Valley Scrappers players
Baseball players from Ohio
Gaither High School alumni
People from Findlay, Ohio
1972 births
Living people